Yolande Trueman (also Duke) is a fictional character from the BBC soap opera EastEnders, played by Angela Wynter from 16 September 2003 to 3 October 2008. The character made an unannounced guest appearance on 20 March 2017 and again on 26 June 2017.

Storylines

2003–2008
Yolande arrives in Albert Square on 16 September 2003, as Patrick Trueman's (Rudolph Walker) holiday romance. They had met during Patrick's visit to his homeland of Trinidad, where the middle-aged couple enjoyed a steamy affair, much the contrary to Yolande's unhappy and stolid marriage to a strict, uptight, and religious Victor (Ben Thomas), whose traditional beliefs objectify women to the purpose of bearing and raising children.

Concerned that all Patrick wants is a casual fling, Yolande prepares to return to Trinidad, but is persuaded to stay after Patrick admits he has fallen in love with her. Victor arrives in Walford to take Yolande home, and gives Patrick £10000 to relinquish and allow him to bring his wife back to Trinidad unhindered. Although tempted, he ultimately refuses, and goes to return the money to Victor; however, Yolande spots Patrick with the money in his hand and mistakenly believes that he has accepted Victor’s offer. She leaves for Trinidad alone, taking the £10000 with her, but returns to Walford upon Victor’s arrival back in Trinidad, settling down and sharing the money with Patrick. 

They eventually marry in 2004, fostering a little girl, Katie (Parhys-Jai Cato). They begin to forge a small business empire in Walford, owning and managing the Minute Mart convenience store on Bridge Street, the square’s bed and breakfast and eventually Trueman’s Motors.

In early 2006, Yolande strikes up a feud with Pat Evans (Pam St Clement) when she starts to become involved in Trueman's Motors, in competition with Pat’s own car dealership. Their rivalry intensifies when Pat begins an affair with Patrick, with their Minute Mart employee Stacey Slater (Lacey Turner) catching them kissing and telling Yolande, causing a brawl in The Queen Victoria public house. Yolande goes to a nightclub to seek revenge in kind on Patrick, and propositions Kevin Wicks (Phil Daniels); he reciprocates, and the pair arrange to go back to his house for sex, but she has second thoughts and backs out. The next day, she confesses to Patrick that she almost had sex with another man, and, albeit reluctantly, decides to give Patrick another chance.

In October 2006, Yolande supposedly has a drunken one-night stand with Aubrey Valentine (Joseph Marcell), Patrick's old friend and former band mate, resulting in Patrick throwing her out of the house. When confronted, however, Aubrey admits the story was fabricated, and Patrick reconciles with Yolande.

In September 2008, Patrick accidentally turns off the chiller cabinet at the Minute Mart and then sells the unrefrigerated food giving a number of customers food poisoning. The complaints that follow result in a visit from a Minute Mart head office inspector, who is so impressed with Yolande's efforts to clean up the shop that she is subsequently offered a job at the Minute Mart HQ in Birmingham. Yolande accepts with delight and busily prepares for the move, however Patrick is less keen and, when confronted, indicates that he wants to stay in Walford, surprising everyone at her leaving party with the announcement that she is leaving alone. On 3 October 2008, Yolande leaves Walford and, as he waves her off at the tube station, Patrick tells her that once the house is sold he will join her in Birmingham; however, the plan never comes to fruition, and on 19 May 2009 Patrick receives their divorce papers, officially bringing an end to their relationship.

2017

Yolande returns in March 2017 when she attends Denise Fox's (Diane Parish) disciplinary hearing at the Minute Mart HQ, attempting to control the meeting to ensure Denise keeps her job. An argument ensues when Harry Beckett (Mark Bagnall) tells Denise that she needs to go on a training course; however, Denise refuses and quits her job while Yolande says that if anyone needs to go on a course, it should be Harry. 

In June 2017, Yolande visits Derek Harkinson (Ian Lavender) at the Minute Mart, informing him that he failed to declare his criminal record on his DBS and if he cannot explain it in a meeting, he will be removed from the back to work scheme. Yolande goes to see her former husband Patrick for his birthday, where they dance and reminisce. Yolande phones Derek to tell him that they have to let him go from the scheme and he has to leave the shop.

Development
Yolande was introduced in 2003 as a love interest for Patrick Trueman (Rudolph Walker) with Angela Wynter being given the role. Yolande was apparently based on Wynter's deceased sister Merlene. Yolande has been described as assertive with a sassy attitude. Wynter has described the original character outline given to Yolande as "bubbly and positive". Discussing Yolande and Patrick's relationship, Wynter has said that Yolande tamed Patrick "with her charm and her toughness. Yolande's vulnerable, but she's principled. He has the same principles. To please her, he'll try not to stray too far away from those principles".

Following their screen marriage in 2004, the Truemans were involved in the BBC's "Taking Care" season, which covered issues "surrounding a different kind of childhood". As part of this, scriptwriters decided that the Truemans would foster a 14-year-old boy, JJ, following an encounter with him at their Bed and Breakfast. In 2007, executive producer Diederick Santer used Patrick and Yolande to cover a storyline about racism, that according to the producer, was inspired by the 2007 Celebrity Big Brother race row, sparked by the racist bullying of Bollywood actress Shilpa Shetty by UK celebrity Jade Goody. In the storyline, the characters Jay Brown and Sean Slater used racist phrases to the Truemans, and their reaction to the insults. Santer commented, "The Celebrity Big Brother race row kicked off as I took charge of my first scripts. I thought it was fascinating because it showed there was a real need for a debate about race in Britain. [Big Brother] didn’t do it particularly well, so I thought it could be something EastEnders should do. Our stuff won’t be overly moralistic or preachy but it will tackle this serious issue head on."

Departure (2008)
On 29 June 2008, it was announced that Wynter would leave EastEnders later in the year, after the show's producers claimed to have "run out of storyline ideas" for her character. Wynter said of the decision: "I’m not unhappy to leave EastEnders because life is about changes and new beginnings, but I am unhappy about the producers reasoning in how they came to their decision because you can always write stories for people to act" She stated that her character would not be killed off, and her hope that Rudolph Walker as her husband Patrick Trueman would not reignite his romance with Pat Butcher after her departure, as; "Patrick and Yolande’s marriage is the only representation of a black union on British TV, which I am very proud to have played." Wynter also suggested that the decision to write out her character may have come because the soap was currently exceeding its 'quota' for black and Asian characters, surmising: "If this is true, I am not hurt because I accept that fact that I live in Britain and it is not ‘our’ TV station where we can be over-weighted with black or Asian actors and have guest appearances from Caucasian actors – because ‘we’ are the guest".

Reception
The Voice claimed that Yolande "was an instant hit with viewers, especially within the African-Caribbean community" and hailed Yolande and Patrick as "most loved black TV couple."

References

External links

British female characters in television
EastEnders characters
Fictional Black British people
Fictional shopkeepers
Television characters introduced in 2003